Andreas Klarström (born 23 December 1977) is a Swedish professional football who plays as midfielder for Vårgårda IK. And who also played for IF Elfsborg

Career

Vårgårda IK
On 22 August 2019 it was confirmed, that 41-year old Klarström had come out of retirement and joined Swedish second division club Vårgårda IK.

References

External links
 

1977 births
Living people
Swedish footballers
Swedish expatriate footballers
IF Elfsborg players
IK Start players
Esbjerg fB players
Allsvenskan players
Danish Superliga players
Swedish expatriate sportspeople in Norway
Swedish expatriate sportspeople in Denmark
Expatriate footballers in Norway
Expatriate men's footballers in Denmark
People from Borås
Association football midfielders
Association football defenders
Sportspeople from Västra Götaland County